Hawthorns (Crataegus species) are used as food plants by the caterpillars of a number of Lepidoptera (butterflies and moths). These include:

Monophagous
Species which feed exclusively on Crataegus

 Batrachedridae
 Batrachedra curvilineella
 Coleophoridae
 Coleophora trigeminella

Polyphagous
Species which feed on Crataegus among other plants

Bucculatricidae
Bucculatrix bechsteinella
Bucculatrix crataegi
Bucculatrix pomifoliella
 Coleophoridae
 Several Coleophora case-bearers, such as:
 C. anatipennella
 C. cerasivorella
 C. coracipennella
 C. hemerobiella
 C. nigricella
 C. siccifolia
 C. spinella (apple-and-plum case-bearer)
 Drepanidae
 Habrosyne pyritoides (buff arches)
 Geometridae
 Agriopis marginaria (dotted border)
 Alcis repandata (mottled beauty)
 Epirrita autumnata (autumnal moth)
 Epirrita christyi (pale November moth)
 Epirrita dilutata (November moth)
 Eupithecia exiguata (mottled pug)
 Eupithecia vulgata (common pug)
 Campaea margaritata (light emerald)
 Chloroclysta truncata (common marbled carpet)
 Chloroclystis rectangulata (green pug)
 Colotois pennaria (feathered thorn)
 Erannis defoliaria (mottled umber)
 Hemithea aestivaria (common emerald)
 Lomographa bimaculata (white-pinion spotted) – leaves
 Odontopera bidentata (scalloped hazel)
 Operophtera brumata (winter moth)
 Opisthograptis luteolata (brimstone moth)
 Ourapteryx sambucaria (swallow-tailed moth)
 Peribatodes rhomboidaria (willow beauty) – leaves
 Lymantriidae
 Euproctis chrysorrhoea (brown-tail)
 Euproctis similis (yellow-tail)
 Lymantria dispar (gypsy moth)
 Noctuidae
 Acronicta psi (grey dagger)
 Acronicta tridens (dark dagger)
 Amphipyra tragopoginis (mouse moth)
 Cosmia trapezina (dun-bar)
 Diarsia mendica (ingrailed clay)
 Eupsilia transversa (satellite)
 Naenia typica (gothic)
 Noctua comes (lesser yellow underwing)
 Noctua janthina (lesser broad-bordered yellow underwing)
 Xestia triangulum (double square-spot)
 Nolidae
 Nola cucullatella (short-cloaked moth)
 Notodontidae
 Ptilodon capucina (coxcomb prominent)
 Nymphalidae
 Limenitis arthemis (American white admiral/red-spotted purple)
 Saturniidae
 Pavonia pavonia (emperor moth)
 Tortricidae
 "Cnephasia" jactatana (black-lyre leafroller moth)
 Enarmonia formosana (cherrybark tortrix) – on bark
 Yponomeutidae
 Scythropia crataegella (hawthorn moth)

External links

Hawthorns
+Lepidoptera